The 1956 LFF Lyga was the 35th season of the LFF Lyga football competition in Lithuania.  It was contested by 12 teams, and Linų Audiniai Plungė won the championship.

League standings

References
RSSSF

LFF Lyga seasons
1956 in Lithuania
LFF